Palazzolo Vercellese (Palasseu in Piedmontese) is a comune (municipality) in the Province of Vercelli in the Italian region Piedmont, located about  northeast of Turin and about  southwest of Vercelli.

Palazzolo Vercellese borders the following municipalities: Camino, Fontanetto Po, Gabiano, and Trino.

Demographic evolution

References